The 1969 Arizona State Sun Devils baseball team represented Arizona State University in the 1969 NCAA University Division baseball season. The team was coached by Bobby Winkles in his 11th season at Arizona State.

The Sun Devils won the College World Series, defeating the Tulsa Golden Hurricane in the championship game.

Roster

Schedule 

! style="background:#FFB310;color:#990033;"| Regular Season
|- valign="top" 

|- align="center" bgcolor="#ddffdd"
| February 27 ||  || 5–0 || 1–0 || –
|- align="center" bgcolor="#ffdddd"
| February 28 ||  || 8–13 || 1–1 || –
|- align="center" bgcolor="#ddffdd"
| March 1 || Chapman || 9–1 || 2–1 || –
|- align="center" bgcolor="#ddffdd"
| March 1 || Chapman || 11–8 || 3–1 || –
|- align="center" bgcolor="#ddffdd"
| March 7 ||  || 3–1 || 4–1 || –
|- align="center" bgcolor="#ddffdd"
| March 8 || Cal State LA || 9–3 || 5–1 || –
|- align="center" bgcolor="#ddffdd"
| March 8 || Cal State LA || 6–0 || 6–1 || –
|- align="center" bgcolor="#ddffdd"
| March 11 || Albuquerque || 10–0 || 7–1 || –
|- align="center" bgcolor="#ddffdd"
| March 11 || Albuquerque || 8–5 || 8–1 || –
|- align="center" bgcolor="#ddffdd"
| March 12 ||  || 3–2 || 9–1 || –
|- align="center" bgcolor="#ddffdd"
| March 13 || San Diego State || 5–1 || 10–1 || –
|- align="center" bgcolor="#ffdddd"
| March 14 ||  || 0–5 || 10–2 || –
|- align="center" bgcolor="#ffdddd"
| March 14 || San Fernando State || 4–5 || 10–3 || –
|- align="center" bgcolor="#ffdddd"
| March 15 || San Fernando State || 4–9 || 10–4 || –
|- align="center" bgcolor="#ffdddd"
| March 17 ||  || 5–10 || 10–5 || –
|- align="center" bgcolor="#ddffdd"
| March 18 || Ohio State || 2–0 || 11–5 || –
|- align="center" bgcolor="#ddffdd"
| March 19 || Ohio State || 5–0 || 12–5 || –
|- align="center" bgcolor="#ddffdd"
| March 21 ||  || 18–14 || 13–5 || –
|- align="center" bgcolor="#ddffdd"
| March 24 || Michigan || 19–3 || 14–5 || –
|- align="center" bgcolor="#ddffdd"
| March 24 || Michigan || 5–3 || 15–5 || –
|- align="center" bgcolor="#ddffdd"
| March 25 || Michigan || 6–5 || 16–5 || –
|- align="center" bgcolor="#ffdddd"
| March 25 || Michigan || 3–4 || 16–6 || –
|- align="center" bgcolor="#ddffdd"
| March 26 ||  || 5–0 || 17–6 || –
|- align="center" bgcolor="ddffdd"
| March 26 ||  || 4–3 || 18–6 || –
|- align="center" bgcolor="ddffdd"
| March 27 ||  || 5–4 || 19–6 || –
|- align="center" bgcolor="#ddffdd"
| March 28 ||  || 11–7 || 20–6 || –
|- align="center" bgcolor="#ddffdd"
| March 29 || Wyoming || 6–4 || 21–6 || –
|- align="center" bgcolor="#ddffdd"
| March 29 || Wyoming || 11–4 || 22–6 || –
|- align="center" bgcolor="#ddffdd"
| March 31 || Wyoming || 18–9 || 23–6 || –
|-

|- align="center" bgcolor="#ddffdd"
| April 4 ||  || 18–0 || 24–6 || –
|- align="center" bgcolor="#ddffdd"
| April 5 || Wisconsin || 11–1 || 25–6 || –
|- align="center" bgcolor="#ddffdd"
| April 5 || Wisconsin || 3–1 || 26–6 || –
|- align="center" bgcolor="#ddffdd"
| April 7 || Wisconsin || 12–1 || 27–6 || –
|- align="center" bgcolor="#ddffdd"
| April 8 || Wisconsin || 7–2 || 28–6 || –
|- align="center" bgcolor="#ddffdd"
| April 9 || Wisconsin || 1–0 || 29–6 || –
|- align="center" bgcolor="#ddffdd"
| April 11 || at  ||  4–3 || 30–6 || 1–0
|- align="center" bgcolor="#ddffdd"
| April 12 || at Arizona ||  11–7 || 31–6 || 2–0
|- align="center" bgcolor="#ffdddd"
| April 12 || at Arizona ||  4–5 || 31–7 || 2–1
|- align="center" bgcolor="#ddffdd"
| April 15 ||  || 7–2 || 32–7 || –
|- align="center" bgcolor="#ddffdd"
| April 18 ||  || 5–0 || 33–7 || 3–1
|- align="center" bgcolor="#ddffdd"
| April 19 || UTEP || 11–6 || 34–7 || 4–1
|- align="center" bgcolor="#ddffdd"
| April 19 || UTEP || 11–0 || 35–7 || 5–1
|- align="center" bgcolor="#ffdddd"
| April 24 || at Albuquerque || 10–12 || 35–8 || –
|- align="center" bgcolor="#ddffdd"
| April 25 || at  || 2–1 || 36–8 || 6–1
|- align="center" bgcolor="#ddffdd"
| April 26 || at New Mexico || 9–5 || 37–8 || 7–1
|- align="center" bgcolor="#ddffdd"
| April 26 || at New Mexico || 13–2 || 38–8 || 8–1
|- align="center" bgcolor="#ddffdd"
| April 29 ||  || 5–1 || 39–8 || –
|-

|- align="center" bgcolor="#ffdddd"
| May 2 || Arizona || 0–2 || 39–9 || 8–2
|- align="center" bgcolor="#ddffdd"
| May 3 || Arizona || 11–0 || 40–9 || 9–2
|- align="center" bgcolor="#ddffdd"
| May 3 || Arizona || 5–0 || 41–9 || 10–2
|- align="center" bgcolor="#ddffdd"
| May 6 || Grand Canyon || 4–0 || 42–9 || –
|- align="center" bgcolor="#ddffdd"
| May 9 || at UTEP || 2–1 || 43–9 || 11–2
|- align="center" bgcolor="#ddffdd"
| May 10 || at UTEP || 10–2 || 44–9 || 12–2
|- align="center" bgcolor="#ddffdd"
| May 10 || at UTEP || 13–1 || 45–9 || 13–2
|- align="center" bgcolor="#ddffdd"
| May 16 || New Mexico || 3–1 || 46–9 || 14–2
|- align="center" bgcolor="#ffdddd"
| May 17 || New Mexico || 3–5 || 46–10 || 14–3
|- align="center" bgcolor="#ddffdd"
| May 17 || New Mexico || 14–0 || 47–10 || 15–3
|-

|-
! style="background:#990033;color:white;"| Post-Season
|-

|- align="center" bgcolor="#ddffdd"
| May 22 || vs.  || 1–0 || 48–10
|- align="center" bgcolor="#ddffdd"
| May 23 || vs.  || 10–0 || 49–10
|-

|- align="center" bgcolor="ddffdd"
| May 30 || vs.  || 7–1 || 50–10
|- align="center" bgcolor="ddffdd"
| May 31 || vs. Idaho || 3–2 || 51–10
|-

|- align="center" bgcolor="ffdddd"
| June 13 || vs. Texas || Rosenblatt Stadium || 0–4 || 51–11
|- align="center" bgcolor="ddffdd"
| June 14 || vs. UCLA || Rosenblatt Stadium || 2–1 || 52–11
|- align="center" bgcolor="ddffdd"
| June 17 || vs.  || Rosenblatt Stadium || 4–2 || 53–11
|- align="center" bgcolor="ddffdd"
| June 18 || vs. Tulsa || Rosenblatt Stadium || 11–3 || 54–11
|- align="center" bgcolor="ddffdd"
| June 19 || vs. NYU || Rosenblatt Stadium || 4–1 || 55–11
|- align="center" bgcolor="ddffdd"
| June 20 || vs. Tulsa || Rosenblatt Stadium || 10–1 || 56–11
|-

Awards and honors 
Billy Cotton
 College World Series All-Tournament Team
 First Team All-American
 First Team All-WAC

Roger Detter
 College World Series All-Tournament Team

Ralph Dick
 First Team All-WAC

John Dolincek
 College World Series Most Outstanding Player

Larry Gura
 College World Series All-Tournament Team
 First Team All-American
 First Team All-WAC

Jeff Osborn
 First Team All-WAC

Paul Powell
 The Sporting News Player of the Year
 College World Series All-Tournament Team
 First Team All-American
 First Team All-WAC

Sun Devils in the 1969 MLB Draft 
The following members of the Arizona State Sun Devils baseball program were drafted in the 1969 Major League Baseball Draft.

References 

Arizona State Sun Devils baseball seasons
College World Series seasons
NCAA Division I Baseball Championship seasons
Arizona State
Western Athletic Conference baseball champion seasons